Fotbal Club Petrolul Ploiești, commonly known as Petrolul Ploiești, or simply as Petrolul, is a Romanian professional football club based in Ploiești, Prahova County. The club has participated in 8 editions of the club competitions governed by UEFA, the chief authority for football across Europe, and in 12 editions of European competitions overall thus far.

Total statistics

Statistics by competition 

Notes for the abbreviations in the tables below:

 PR: Preliminary round
 QR: Qualifying round
 1R: First round
 2R: Second round
 QF: Quarter-finals
 2QR: Second qualifying round
 3QR: Third qualifying round
 PO: Play-off round

UEFA Champions League / European Cup 

1 Wismut Karl Marx Stadt progressed to the first round after winning a play-off match 4–0.

2 Liverpool progressed to the second round after winning a play-off match 2–0.

UEFA Cup Winners' Cup / European Cup Winners' Cup

Inter-Cities Fairs Cup 

3 Petrolul Ploiești progressed to the quarter-finals after winning a play-off match 1–0.

UEFA Europa League / UEFA Cup

UEFA Intertoto Cup

1990 – Group 9

References

External links
 Official site

Europe
Petrolul Ploiesti